Agentic leadership derives from the term agency. This leadership style is generally found in the business field by a person who is respected by subordinates. This person demonstrates assertiveness, competitiveness, independence, courageousness, and is masterful in achieving their task at hand.

See also
Group leadership
Leadership
Transactional leadership
Transformational leadership

References 
Bakan, D.(1966). The duality of human existence. Chicago: Rand McNally.
Haslett, B., Geis, F. L., & Carter, M. R. (1992). The organizational woman: Power and paradox. Norwood, NJ: Alex Publishing Corporation.
Carli, L. L., & Eagly, A. H. (1999). Gender effects on social influences and emergent leadership. In G. N. Powell (Ed), Handbook of gender and work: 203–222. Thousand Oaks, CA: Sage.

Leadership